Jean Farmer-Butterfield (born October 21, 1947) is an American politician who served as a member of the North Carolina House of Representatives for the 24th district from January 2003 to July 2020.

Early life and education
Farmer-Butterfield was born in Wilson, North Carolina. She earned a Bachelor and Master of Arts from North Carolina Central University.

Career 
Farmer-Butterfield has worked as a consultant and manager of non-profits in the health and human services field for many years.

Farmer-Butterfield was elected to the North Carolina House of Representatives in 2002 and assumed office in 2003. During her tenure, she served as a House majority whip from 2007 to 2011. She lost that position after the Republican Party members gained control of the North Carolina House of Representatives in the 2010 election.

In 2020, Governor Roy Cooper nominated Farmer-Butterfield to the state Employment Security Board of Review, an appointment that requires confirmation by the legislature. She was confirmed on July 8, 2020 and resigned from her seat in the House.

Personal life 
In 1971, Farmer-Butterfield married G. K. Butterfield, an attorney, jurist, and politician who has served as a member of the United States House of Representatives since 2004. They have two adult daughters, Valeisha Butterfield Jones and Lenai Butterfield. The couple divorced in 1991.

References

External links
Profile at the North Carolina General Assembly 
 

Democratic Party members of the North Carolina House of Representatives
Living people
Women state legislators in North Carolina
People from Wilson, North Carolina
1947 births
African-American women in politics
African-American state legislators in North Carolina
21st-century American politicians
21st-century American women politicians
21st-century African-American women
21st-century African-American politicians
20th-century African-American people
20th-century African-American women